The Valdostana Castana is an Italian breed of cattle from Valle d'Aosta region in north-western Italy. It is one of three regional breeds in the area, the others being the Valdostana Pezzata Nera and the Valdostana Pezzata Rossa. The Valdostana Castana ranges in colour from chestnut-brown to black. It derives from cross-breeding of imported Hérens stock with the local Pezzata Nera (black-pied) cattle. While the Valdostana Castana is raised both for meat and for milk, its principal characteristic is its ability in the Bataille de Reines, the annual cow-fighting contests held in the region. Partly due to its combative nature, it is not suited to intensive farming, and management is normally transhumant: the cattle are stabled only in winter, and spend the summer months on the mountain pastures of the Alps.

History 

The Valdostana Castana is a relatively recent breed; only black-pied and red-pied cattle are documented in the Valle d'Aosta in texts of the early twentieth century. Despite the strict regulations governing the herd-book for the Valdostana Pezzata Nera, breeders introduced imported Hérens blood. The Castana was officially recognised by the Ministero delle Politiche Agricole Alimentari e Forestali, the Italian ministry of agriculture, in 1985. It is registered in the herd-book of the Pezzata Nera, and is considered to differ from it only in the colour of the coat.

Most of the population is concentrated in the hills flanking the valley of the Dora Baltea between Châtillon and Aosta. In 2014 the total population was reported to be  head.

Characteristics 

The Valdostana Castana ranges in colour from chestnut-brown to black. The hooves and mucosa are slate-coloured or black. It is robust and hardy, and well able to exploit high mountain pasture. Its principal characteristic is its ability in the Bataille de Reines, the annual cow-fighting contests held in the Valle d'Aosta region. Partly due to its combative nature, it is not suited to intensive farming; management is transhumant: the cattle are stabled only in winter, and spend the summer months on the mountain pastures of the Alps.

Use 

While the Valdostana Castana is raised both for meat and for milk, its principal characteristic is its ability in the Bataille de Reines, the annual cow-fighting contests held in the region. Despite recent selection for improved dairy performance, milk yields remain low.

Informal cow-fighting contests have been documented for more than 150 years. In the Valle d'Aosta, formal management of fights dates from 1958, when the Comité Regional des Batailles de Reines was formed. The contests have become an important socio-cultural event. Some twenty contests are held between March and October each year, culminating in a final battle and the crowning of the Reine or "queen". Success may significantly increase the market value of cows.

References

Cattle breeds originating in Italy